Gabrić is a Croatian surname. Notable people with the surname include:

Drago Gabrić (born 1986), Croatian football midfielder
Gabre Gabric (1914/1917–2015), Croatian-born Italian track and field athlete
Nikica Gabrić (born 1961), Croatian physician and politician
Tonči Gabrić (born 1961), former Croatian football player

Croatian surnames